Amit Cohen (born 22 July 1999) is an Israeli footballer who plays as a goalkeeper for US college team Florida Atlantic Owls and the Israel women's national team.

Biography
Cohen was raised in Eilat.

Sports career
Cohen was capped for the Israel national team, appearing for the team during the 2019 FIFA Women's World Cup qualifying cycle.

References

External links
 
 
 
 
 

1999 births
Living people
Footballers from Eilat
Israeli women's footballers
Women's association football goalkeepers
Florida Atlantic Owls women's soccer players
Israel women's international footballers
Jewish Israeli sportspeople
Israeli expatriate women's footballers
Expatriate women's soccer players in the United States
Israeli expatriate sportspeople  in the United States